Thomas Muster was the defending champion of the singles event at the Australian Men's Hardcourt Championships tennis tournament, but did not participate this year.

Nicklas Kulti defeated Michael Stich 6–3, 1–6, 6–2 to secure the title.

Seeds

  Boris Becker (first round)
  Jim Courier (semifinals)
  Horst Skoff (first round)
  Sergi Bruguera (first round)
  Magnus Gustafsson (second round)
  Michael Stich (final)
  Mark Koevermans (first round)
  Todd Woodbridge (second round)

Draw

Finals

Top half

Bottom half

External links
1991 Australian Men's Hardcourt Championships Draw

Singles